John Ross Millar (25 October 1923 – 2 February 1986) was a Scottish professional footballer who played as a centre forward for Preston Athletic, Albion Rovers, Bradford City and Weymouth.

References

1923 births
1986 deaths
Scottish footballers
Preston Athletic F.C. players
Albion Rovers F.C. players
Bradford City A.F.C. players
Weymouth F.C. players
Scottish Football League players
English Football League players
People from Armadale, West Lothian
Association football forwards
Footballers from West Lothian